Football 5-a-side has been contested in the Asian Para Games since its inception in 2010. Only men has competed in the football 5-a-side event in the games as of the 2014 edition. It was not contested in the 2018 games.

Summaries

Per nation